Robert Sheringham (1602–1678) was an English linguist, scholar and royalist writer.

Life
He was born in Guestwick, Norfolk. He studied at Gonville and Caius College, Cambridge, where he was B.A. in 1623, M.A.and Fellow in 1628. Though often believed to have been removed from his fellowship in 1644 (alongside the removal of other 'royalist' fellows), he held his post until 1651 before being expelled. He was restored in 1660. While in exile, he taught Arabic and Hebrew in Rotterdam.

Works
He suggested a Talmudic origin of some of the New Testament parables.

In The King's Supremacy Asserted (1660) he denied the possibility of a “mixed monarchy”. Monarchy, he said, was "the government of one alone."

De Anglorum Gentis Origine Disceptatio (1670) was a work on the origins of the English language and people. It agreed with Samuel Bochart in its emphasis on the Phoenicians, and followed in part Verstegan in making English identity largely Germanic. It influenced Aylett Sammes (c. 1636 – c. 1679), author of Britannia Antiqua Illustrata. It took a linguistic interest in origins, matching Welsh words to the Greek language. David C. Douglas regarded it as too credulous.

Notes

1602 births
1678 deaths
Christian Hebraists
Alumni of Gonville and Caius College, Cambridge
Fellows of Gonville and Caius College, Cambridge